Pranab Bardan is an Indian bridge player. He won gold at the 2018 Asian Games in men's pair event with Shibhnath Sarkar. Bridge Federation of India nominated him for Arjuna Award in 2020.

References 

Living people
Indian contract bridge players
Asian Games gold medalists for India
Bridge players at the 2018 Asian Games
Asian Games medalists in bridge
Medalists at the 2018 Asian Games
Year of birth missing (living people)